The following low-power television stations broadcast on digital or analog channel 50 in the United States:

 K50GA-D in Laketown, etc., Utah
 K50GL-D in Bonners Ferry, Idaho, to move to channel 26
 KHDE-LD in Denver, Colorado, to move to channel 4
 KTCJ-LD in Minneapolis, Minnesota, to move to channel 13
 W50CO in Jacksonville, Florida, to move to channel 32
 WHOB-LD in Buxton, North Carolina, to move to channel 35
 WQUB500 in Camp Verde, Arizona

The following television stations, which are no longer licensed, formerly broadcast on digital or analog channel 50:
 K50AC in Woodland & Kamas, Utah
 K50DY-D in Capulin, etc., New Mexico
 K50EC in Fruitland, Utah
 K50EH in Fairbanks, Alaska
 K50EZ in Montrose, etc., Colorado
 K50GM in Hobbs, New Mexico
 K50GO in Roosevelt, Utah
 K50GP in Redding, California
 K50JG in Independence, Kansas
 K50JI in North Platte, Nebraska
 K50MO-D in Palmer, Alaska
 K50NL-D in Lowry, South Dakota
 KAMT-LP in Amarillo, Texas
 KATA-CD in Mesquite, Texas
 KBIT-LD in Chico, California
 KCCE-LP in San Luis Obispo, California
 KMAO-LP in Raymondville, Texas
 KPSG-LP in Palm Springs, California
 KTSS-LP in Hope, Arkansas
 KUME-LP in Midland/Odessa, Texas
 W50BO in Ashville, Alabama
 W50EQ-D in Lumberton, North Carolina
 WGSA-CA in Savannah, Georgia
 WNGS-LP in Anderson, South Carolina
 WQEH-LD in Jackson, Tennessee

References

50 low-power TV stations in the United States